Zara Yarahmadi (born 1985) is a contemporary Iranian fashion designer. Her label was established in Tehran in 1998.

Zahra Yarahmadi was born in 1985 and grew up in Iran. She is a fashion designer and many of her works have been named as a national art craft. She launched her own brand named Deja vu colourful designs in 1998.

References

External links

Iranian fashion designers
Iranian women fashion designers
Living people
1985 births